Pervez Amirali Hoodbhoy (born 11 July 1950) is a Pakistani nuclear physicist and activist who serves as a professor at the Forman Christian College and previously taught physics at the Quaid-e-Azam University. Hoodbhoy is also a prominent activist in particular concerned with promotion of freedom of speech, secularism, scientific temper and education in Pakistan.

Born and raised in Karachi, in a Gujarati household, Hoodbhoy studied at the Massachusetts Institute of Technology for nine years, where he received degrees in electrical engineering, mathematics and solid-state physics, eventually leading to a PhD in nuclear physics. In 1981, Hoodbhoy went on to conduct post-doctoral research at the University of Washington, before leaving to serve as a visiting professor at the Carnegie Mellon University in 1985. While still a professor at the Quaid-e-Azam University, Hoodbhoy worked as a guest scientist at the International Centre for Theoretical Physics from 1986 to 1994. He remained with the Quaid-e-Azam University until 2010, throughout which he held visiting professorships at MIT, University of Maryland and Stanford Linear Collider.

In 2011, Hoodbhoy joined LUMS while also working as a researcher with Princeton University and as copa columnist with the Express Tribune. His contract with LUMS was terminated in 2013 which resulted in a controversy. He is a sponsor of the Bulletin of the Atomic Scientists, and a member of the monitoring panel on terrorism of the World Federation of Scientists. Hoodbhoy has won several awards including the Abdus Salam Prize for Mathematics (1984); the Kalinga Prize for the popularization of science (2003); the Joseph A. Burton Forum Award (2010) from the American Physical Society. In 2011, he was included in the list of 100 most influential global thinkers by Foreign Policy. In 2013, he was made a member of the UN Secretary General's Advisory Board on Disarmament.

He is the author of Islam and Science: Religious Orthodoxy and the Battle for Rationality. He is the head of Mashal Books in Lahore, which claims to make "a major translation effort to produce books in Urdu that promote modern thought, human rights, and emancipation of women". Hoodbhoy has written for Project Syndicate, DAWN, The New York Times and The Express Tribune. Hoodbhoy is generally considered one of the most vocal, progressive and liberal members of the Pakistani intelligentsia. His daughter, Alia Amirali, is also a well-known feminist and political activist.

Early and personal life
Hoodbhoy was born and raised in Karachi, Sindh, in a Gujarati family belonging to the Ismaili Shia community. He has at least one older brother. He has been married twice, first to Hajra Ahmed, niece of activist Eqbal Ahmad. Hoodbhoy and Hajra Ahmed have two daughters together, including Alia Amirali. They were divorced in the early 2010s. Hoodbhoy later married Sadia Manzoor, who is also, like him, a physics professor. They were married late in life and do not have children together.

Education
Hoodbhoy attended the Karachi Grammar School in Karachi for his initial schooling. After graduating, at the age of 19, Hoodbhoy went to the United States to attend the Massachusetts Institute of Technology (MIT) on a scholarship. While attending MIT, Hoodbhoy worked for a local Pakistani restaurant based in Massachusetts to support his studies and showed a great interest in electronics and mathematics.

At MIT, Hoodbhoy graduated with a double BSc in Electrical Engineering and Mathematics in 1971, followed by an MSc in physics with a concentration in solid-state physics in 1973. After graduation, Hoodbhoy joined the Quaid-e-Azam University (QAU) as a researcher and renewed his scholarship to resume his studies in the United States.

Hoodbhoy continued his research in doctoral studies in physics at  MIT, and was awarded a PhD in nuclear physics in 1978. In the United States, his collaboration took place with the scientists who participated in the Manhattan Project in the 1940s, which set of experiences subsequently influenced in his philosophy. Hoodbhoy remained a post-doctoral research fellow at the University of Washington for a short time. In 1973, Hoodbhoy joined the Institute of Physics of the University of Engineering and Technology in Lahore.

Career

Academia 
Hoodbhoy focused his research career extensively on quantum field theory, particle phenomenology, and supersymmetry in the area of particle physics. After receiving his PhD from MIT, Hoodbhoy met Riazuddin and Abdus Salam– the prominent Pakistani physicists who were visiting MIT to give lectures on particle physics. Subsequently, he joined a group of Pakistani physicists at the International Centre for Theoretical Physics in Trieste, Italy. At ICTP, Hoodbhoy collaborated with Pakistan's leading theoretical physicists who worked under Abdus Salam in the 1970s.

After ICTP work, Hoodbhoy returned to Pakistan to join Quaid-e-Azam University (QAU) where he began teaching and lecturing on physics. Eventually, he became chairman of the Institute of Theoretical Physics (now the Department of Physics). After spending more than 30 years at QAU, Hoodbhoy moved to Lahore where he joined the Lahore University of Management Sciences as a visiting professor, while remaining a visiting scientist at the Stanford Linear Accelerator Center. Controversy over his contract at LUMS sparked an academic debate when it was reported in the news media that Hoodbhoy's email to the Vice-Chancellor of LUMS was made public. Eventually, Hoodbhoy moved to Forman Christian College University permanently and joined the senior staff to instruct courses on physics.

Prior to his return to Pakistan in 1976, Hoodbhoy was aware of the country’s secretive development program on nuclear deterrence . Hoodbhoy maintains his close ties with Pakistan's vibrant nuclear society, and had collaborated with many of country's leading theoretical physicists throughout his career, mainly with Ishfaq Ahmad. On several occasions, Hoodbhoy staunchly countered Dr. Abdul Qadeer Khan's "father-of" claims, and roundly criticized his academic research on nuclear physics. In the 1980s, he famously debated with Bashiruddin Mahmood on the topics of sunspots, life-after-death, and philosophy.

In 1999, Hoodbhoy with Ishfaq Ahmad and Riazuddin, played a major and influential role in the establishment of the National Center for Physics (NCP), becoming one of the earliest academics and scientists to join the NCP at its inception.

Hoodbhoy has roundly criticized the development of nuclear weapons, especially in South Asia, mainly by India and Pakistan. In 2011, Hoodbhoy held India responsible for Pakistan's symmetric nuclear weapons programme as part of Pakistan's self-credible deterrence. According to Hoodbhoy, India's nuclear tests forced Pakistan to jump into the nuclear arena in 1974, and again in 1998, after war-threatening statements were made by the Indian government to Pakistan; Pakistan equalised this situation the same month. While believing that Pakistan's nuclear deterrence has protected the country from any foreign aggression and preventing from numerous war threatening situations with India, Hoodbhoy has raised concerns about the security of nuclear arsenals and the possibility of radicals gaining control.

Activism 
Hoodbhoy is a prominent sponsor of the Bulletin of the Atomic Scientists, representing Pakistan's delegation.

Apart from his specialist field of research, Hoodbhoy extensively writes and speaks on topics ranging from science in Islam to education and arms disarmament issues around the world. He is the author of Islam and Science: Religious Orthodoxy and the Battle for Rationality, which has been translated into five languages. In this book, Hoodbhoy outlines the history of Pakistan, the implications of theocracy and martial law in Pakistan, and textbook revival in the education system of Pakistan. His articles and publications are repeatedly published in both technical and non-technical journals, as well as in local international media  

Hoodbhoy widely writes about the role and modernisation of the Pakistani military, particularly  defence budget spending by the Pakistani government on the military. Hoodbhoy has criticized what he sees as the merger of science with religion, especially in Pakistan; by contrast he pointed out Iran, whose religious leaders have kept science and religion separate. In 2003 he was a signatory of the Humanist Manifesto. Hoodbhoy criticized the partition of India, calling it an "unspeakable tragedy" that "separated people who at one time could live together in peace".

Hoodbhoy has criticized the Pakistan Higher Education Commission (HEC) for pursuing "a drive to achieve numbers rather than quality". He believes that because of "policies that reward authors of research articles and PhD supervisors with cash and promotions", universities in Pakistan have "turned into factories producing junk papers and PhDs."
He has been a harsh critic of the performance of HEC since 2003 when it was led by Dr. Atta-ur-Rahman, and the issue has led to heated debates in Pakistan's news media.

In 2009 Hoodbhoy came into conflict with Atta-ur-Rahman, an organic chemist, over the Higher Education Commission (HEC). In the United States, the journal Nature published an article on the successes and failures of the HEC. Hoodbhoy wrote to complain about, among other things, the article's failure to mention (what Hoodbhoy called) "the billions wasted on mindless prestige mega-projects".
In the debate on the HEC, other Pakistani academics and scientists such as Adil Najam, Abdul Qadeer Khan, and Atta-ur-Rehman defended the HEC while disagreeing with most of Hoodbhoy's criticisms.

The administrative competency of the HEC was called into question by Hoodbhoy who described its achievements as "dismal". Hoodbhoy supported his arguments against HEC's productivity, that in the case of UESTP-France convention in Karachi, out of an expected faculty strength of between 450 and 600, no French faculty or administrative staff actually arrived. At the television debate, Hoodbhoy questioned the statistics used to support the positive appraisal of HEC's activities in a series of communications between Hoodbhoy and HEC chairman Atta-Ur-Rehman. It was claimed by the latter that in mathematics, Pakistani authors received 20% more citations than the worldwide average. Hoodbhoy questioned this on several grounds including the number of self-citations these publications received and said that this was a crucial aspect that the HEC left out of its interpretation. Criticism was leveled by Hoodbhoy at the practice of hiring those foreign academics in local universities who were said to have difficulty in communicating and teaching, although they contributed to boosting the number of research publications originating from Pakistani universities.

Research 
Hoodbhoy has made important contributions in physics, particularly in particle physics. Many of Hoodbhoy's recorded lectures on physics are available online. At National Center for Physics, Hoodbhoy conducted research on different aspects of particle physics, and pioneered studies in modern physics and its extension to mathematical and nuclear physics. In 2006, Hoodbhoy published a brief mathematical description of Generalized Parton Distributions. In 2007, Hoodbhoy re-published the work of Jens Lyng Peterson the Maldacena conjecture (a conjectured equivalence between a string theory and gravity defined on one space, and a quantum field theory without gravity defined by one or less dimension) where he contributed mathematically to the theory. In the same year, he re-published the work of Edward Witten on Anti-de Sitter space and its extension to the field of Holography. While the paper was published experimentally in 1998 by Witten, Hoodbhoy provided the brief mathematical proofs and description to understand, logically, the subject of Sitter space— a scalar curvature in general theory of relativity.

On 14 April 2001, it was announced that Dr. Hoodbhoy would be receiving Sitara-i-Imtiaz from the former President, General (retired) Pervez Musharraf which he refused to accept. He said that it would give him no satisfaction. He further added that the award does not imply that you have done good work in your field.

Filmography 
He produced a 13-part documentary series in Urdu for Pakistan Television on critical issues in education, and two series aimed at popularising science. In 2004, he made a documentary film 'Crossing the Lines: Kashmir, Pakistan, India' along with Dr. Zia Mian. These documentaries carry heavy emphasis on the issues of education, public health and scientific revolution in Pakistan.

In his documentaries, Dr. Hoodbhoy has heavily criticised Pakistan and India's nuclear weapons program. He also pointed out the seriousness of the Talibanization in Pakistan and its immediate effects on South Asia. His documentaries also point out that American and NATO forces in Afghanistan didn't help the Afghan people's life and there was no reform in Afghanistan's social and public sector and, instead, the insurgency and corruption grew, which also destabilised Pakistan's western front.
 Crossing the Lines: Kashmir, Pakistan, India (2004)
 The Bell Tolls for Planet Earth (2003)
 Pakistan and India Under the Nuclear Shadow (2001)

Publications

Books
 Education and the State: Fifty Years Of Pakistan Oxford University Press, 1998. 
 Islam and Science: Religious Orthodoxy and the Battle for Rationality Zed Books, London, 1992. , (Translations in Arabic, Indonesian, Malaysian, Turkish, Japanese, and Urdu)
 (Co-Edited with A. Ali), Proceedings of the School on Fundamental Physics and Cosmology World Scientific, Singapore, 1991.
 (With A. H. Nayyar), "Rewriting the History of Pakistan", in Islam, Politics and the State: The Pakistan Experience, Ed. Mohammad Asghar Khan, Zed Books, London, 1986.

Scientific papers and articles
 
 
 
 
 
 
 
 
 
 
 
 
 
 
 
 
 Detecting Two-Photon Exchange Effects in Hard Scattering from Nucleon Targets, in Mathematical Physics: Proceedings of the 12th Regional Conference, Islamabad, Pakistan 27 March – 1 April 2006, World Scientific, Singapore, 2007. 
 Abdus Salam: Past and Present- The News (29 January 1996)
 Generalized Parton Distributions, Pervez Hoodbhoy, Quaid-e-Azam University, Islamabad

Appearances in TV shows
 Raaste Ilm ke (Pathways to Knowledge) on PTV, 1988
 Asrar-e-Jahan (Mysteries of the Universe) on PTV, 1995
 Bazm-e-Kainat (Gathering of all Creation)  on PTV, 2003
 Alif on Geo TV. Debate with Jawed Ghamidi, 2006
 Aik Din Geo Kay Saath on Geo TV, February 2010
 Capital Talk on Geo TV, 29 August 2012
 Salam-The first Nobel laureate (NETFLIX) 2018

See also
Tafazzul Husain Kashmiri
Abdus Salam

Notes

Further reading
  Kaznain, Hazim. "Pakistanischer Atomphysiker: "Muslimische Gesellschaften sind kollektiv gescheitert" (Archive). Der Spiegel. Monday 28 January 2013. Interview with Hoodbhoy.

External links
 A complete repository of Pervez Hoodbhoy's articles in the making
 Profile, QAU
 Pervez Hoodbhoy's recent articles for Z Magazine
 Pervez Hoodbhoy's articles for the website Chowk.com
 Pervez Hoodbhoy's research papers
 Science and the Islamic world—The quest for rapprochement, Pervez Hoodbhoy, American Institute of Physics, August 2007
 Video Presentation: "Sacred Terror: Theirs and Ours." Professor Hoodbhoy speaking at the University of Illinois, October 2007.
 Pakistan's westward drift – article by P Hoodbhoy lamenting the rising tide of militant Islam in Pakistan
 Islamic Failure – 2002 article by P Hoodbhoy, first published in The Washington Post and reprinted in Prospect''

Living people
1950 births
People from Karachi
Pakistani Ismailis
Pakistani people of Gujarati descent
Karachi Grammar School alumni
Pakistani expatriates in the United States
MIT School of Engineering alumni
Pakistani physicists
Pakistani electrical engineers
MIT Department of Physics alumni
Pakistani nuclear physicists
Pakistani educators
Pakistani scientists
Pakistani scholars
Academic staff of Quaid-i-Azam University
Members of the Pakistan Philosophical Congress
Pakistani anti–nuclear weapons activists
Pakistani anti-war activists
Pakistani democracy activists
Pakistani science writers
Kalinga Prize recipients
Academic staff of Lahore University of Management Sciences
Academic staff of the Forman Christian College
Pakistani humanists
Pakistani science journalists
Pakistani secularists
Urdu-language writers